Louis Mafouta (born 2 July 1994) is a professional footballer who plays as a striker for  club Quevilly-Rouen. Born in France, he plays for the Central African Republic national team.

Club career
Born in Beaumont-sur-Oise, he has played for Saint-Ouen-l'Aumône, Panserraikos, Senlis, Chambly and Chambly II.

In January 2019, he moved to Grasse.

In August 2020, Mafouta signed a two-year contract with Swiss Challenge League club Neuchâtel Xamax.

On 19 January 2022, Mafouta joined Metz in Ligue 1 on loan with an option to buy.

On 1 July 2022, Mafouta signed a three-year contract with Quevilly-Rouen.

International career
He made his international debut for the Central African Republic in 2017.

Career statistics
Scores and results list the Central African Republic's goal tally first, score column indicates score after each Mafouta goal.

References

1994 births
Living people
People from Beaumont-sur-Oise
Citizens of the Central African Republic through descent
Central African Republic footballers
Association football forwards
Central African Republic international footballers
French footballers
Footballers from Val-d'Oise
French sportspeople of Central African Republic descent
Panserraikos F.C. players
FC Chambly Oise players
RC Grasse players
Neuchâtel Xamax FCS players
FC Metz players
US Quevilly-Rouen Métropole players
Football League (Greece) players
Championnat National players
Championnat National 2 players
Swiss Challenge League players
Ligue 1 players
French expatriate footballers
Central African Republic expatriate footballers
Expatriate footballers in Greece
French expatriate sportspeople in Greece
Central African Republic expatriate sportspeople in Greece
Expatriate footballers in Switzerland
French expatriate sportspeople in Switzerland
Central African Republic expatriate sportspeople in Switzerland